Melanie Thomas is a Welsh international lawn bowler.

Bowls career
Thomas became a national champion in 2019 after winning the singles at the Welsh National Bowls Championships.

In 2019 she won the fours gold medal at the Atlantic Bowls Championships

References

Welsh female bowls players
Living people
Year of birth missing (living people)